Lightweight is a 2004 French drama film directed by Jean-Pierre Améris. It was screened in the Un Certain Regard section at the 2004 Cannes Film Festival.

Cast
 Nicolas Duvauchelle – Antoine
 Bernard Campan – Chief
 Maï Anh Le – Su
 Sophie Quinton – Claire
 Elisabeth Commelin – Hélène
 Frédéric Gorny – Pierre
 Gilles Treton – Le directeur des pompes funèbres
 Stéphane Daimé – Un collègue d'Antoine
 Xavier Daimé – Un collègue d'Antoine

References

External links

2004 films
2010s French-language films
2004 drama films
Films directed by Jean-Pierre Améris
Pan-Européenne films
French drama films
2000s French films
2010s French films